Panti Usu (Aymara panti a type of flower, usu illness, Hispanicized spelling Pantiuso) is a mountain in the Andes of southern Peru, about  high. It lies on a high ridge southeast of Lake Wisk'acha and southwest of the lake Lurisquta. Panti Usu is situated in the Puno Region, El Collao Province, Santa Rosa District, and in the Tacna Region, Candarave Province, Candarave District.

References

Mountains of Peru
Mountains of Puno Region
Mountains of Tacna Region